The Independent Commission Against Corruption (ICAC) is an agency of the Government of New South Wales responsible for eliminating and investigating corrupt activities and enhancing the integrity of the state's public administration.

It is led by a Chief Commissioner appointed for a fixed five-year term; and two part-time Commissioners. Then-NSW Premier Mike Baird suggested in November 2016 his desire to move from a sole Commissioner to a three-commissioner system, however this was strongly criticised by two former ICAC commissioners as weakening and politicising the organisation, leading to the resignation of then-Commissioner Megan Latham. The Chief Commissioner is currently John Hatzistergos, former state Labor minister and District Court judge. Helen Murrell  and Paul Lakatos  are currently part-time Commissioners.

The Chief Commissioner is required to submit a report on the activities of the Commission to the Parliament of New South Wales and whilst independent of the politics of government, reports informally to the Premier of New South Wales. The commission is charged with educating public authorities, officials and members of the public about corruption.

Inspector 

The Inspector of the Independent Commission Against Corruption is an independent statutory officer whose role and functions is to hold the ICAC accountable in the way it carries out its function. The Inspector’s role are set out in Part 5A of the ICAC Act. The Inspector is not answerable to ICAC in any way and is located in physically separate premises from the ICAC. The Inspector's role includes: undertaking audits of the ICAC’s operations to ensure compliance with the law; dealing with complaints about the conduct of the ICAC and current and former officers; and assessing the effectiveness and appropriateness of the ICAC's procedures.

The Inspector has extensive powers to investigate the conduct of the ICAC and its officers including obtaining documents from the ICAC and requiring ICAC officers to attend before him and answer questions. The Inspector can also sit as a Royal Commissioner in order to conduct investigations. As a Royal Commissioner the Inspector has extensive powers to compel witnesses to provide evidence. The Inspector can deal with complaints about the conduct of the ICAC or its officers which concern abuses of power, impropriety, misconduct of any kind, lengthy delays in investigation and maladministration. Under the ICAC Act maladministration is defined as action or inaction of a serious nature that is contrary to law, or unreasonable, unjust, oppressive or improperly discriminatory, or based wholly or partly on improper motives.

Structure and operation
The ICAC has jurisdiction over state and local government in New South Wales. This extends to parliamentarians, local councillors, the Governor of New South Wales, public servants, and staff of universities and state-owned corporations.  Anyone can refer a matter to the commission.  In 2014 it was estimated that less than one per cent out of around 3,000 complaints annually result in a public hearing.  The commission has the coercive powers of a Royal Commission and can compel witnesses to testify. Public hearings are designed to act as a preventative measure against corruption.  Where the ICAC rules that an official has acted corruptly, the charges are referred to the criminal justice system for consideration by the Director of Public Prosecutions to lay criminal charges.

There are only limited controls on admissible evidence, which may be obtained by compulsion and coercion or other means that would make it inadmissible in a court of law. Often evidence used in ICAC cases cannot subsequently be used in related criminal proceedings. There is no right to silence for witnesses called to the Commission and failure to testify (along with misleading the commission) can lead to five-year jail terms. While the ICAC cannot impose custodial sentences (other than for procedural matters), it can recommend that criminal charges be considered by the Department of Public Prosecution. In practice it has achieved very few convictions following its investigations and has had key findings such as that against former Premier Greiner found as going beyond its powers. As well as its inquisitorial powers, ICAC has telephone intercept powers.

From its establishment until November 2016, the ICAC was led by a single commissioner, who, although the agency belongs within the New South Wales Premier's Department, reported directly to the presiding officers of the Parliament of New South Wales. The commissioner served a single five-year term and cannot be dismissed except by the Governor. Following the passage of the Independent Commission Against Corruption Amendment Act 2016 (NSW), the agency was reconstituted as a three-member Commission, comprising a chief commissioner and two other commissioners; and in order for a public hearing to be held as part of any corruption investigation, the chief commissioner and at least one other commissioner must agree.

Development
The 1980s saw a number of corruption scandals break around Australia, involving the Labor administrations in New South Wales, Victoria and Western Australia (WA Inc), the Liberal government in Tasmania and the Nationals administration in Queensland (Fitzgerald Inquiry).

In 1988, Nick Greiner, a Liberal, ran against Labor in New South Wales on an anti-corruption platform and won.  Introducing legislation to establish the ICAC, Greiner told Parliament:

History
The ICAC's first task was to investigate activities of the previous Wran and Unsworth governments. No charges were recommended by the commission.

In 1992, the ICAC ruled that Premier Greiner's offer of a government job to former minister Terry Metherell was an act of "technical" corruption. Although the charges were later dismissed by the courts, the four independent MPs on whom the premier relied for a majority in the Legislative Assembly indicated that they would no longer support his leadership. Greiner resigned and was replaced by John Fahey.

In 2008, the ICAC documented entrenched corruption within RailCorp. A range of offences were investigated, involving staff at many levels, and A$19 million was found to have been improperly allocated.

The ICAC began focusing on ministerial level corruption from 2010.  In November 2010, the commission released a report titled Investigation into Corruption Risks Involved in Lobbying.  It recommended the implementation of a new lobbying regulatory scheme to provide transparency and to reduce both the risk of corruption and public distrust.

In 2014, the ICAC investigated alleged corrupt activities relating to a water infrastructure company.  It called Premier Barry O'Farrell as a witness and asked if he recalled being sent a gift of a $2,978 bottle of wine by the CEO of the company. O'Farrell said he had no recollection of such a gift. When a thank-you note in O'Farrell's handwriting was produced the next day, O'Farrell immediately announced that he would resign as party leader and as Premier.

Later during the same case, NSW Police Minister Mike Gallacher voluntarily stood down as minister after counsel assisting alleged that he been involved in obtaining an illegal political donation.  However, Premier Mike Baird required him to resign. ICAC ultimately did not proceed with corruption charges.

On 15 April 2015 in a 4:1 majority ruling in relation to an ICAC investigation into alleged conduct of Margaret Cunneen , the High Court of Australia found that the ICAC had exceeded its authority based on a misinterpretation of "corrupt conduct" in the Act. Section 8(2) of the Act defined "corrupt conduct" as conduct that "adversely affects, or that could adversely affect ... the exercise of official functions by any public official".  The High Court found that, in this context, "adversely affect" means "adversely affect or could adversely affect the probity of the exercise of an official function by a public official" and not "adversely affect or could adversely affect the efficacy of the exercise of an official function by a public official in the sense that the official could exercise the function in a different manner or make a different decision from that which would otherwise be the case". The Court ruled that Cunneen's alleged conduct might have affected the official's choice of action but would not have affected the official's probity in making that choice. The Court accepted that the alleged conduct of Cunneen, a senior public prosecutor, would have been in a private and not an official capacity. The Cunneen decision raised questions about whether ICAC exceeded its powers in some earlier and current high-profile corruption investigations. Nonetheless, in May 2015 the ICAC referred the allegations against Cunneen to the New South Wales Director of Public Prosecutions;  in July 2015 the Solicitor General determined that a prosecution was not warranted.

Some of those investigations into governmental corruption had led to ICAC reports that recommended legislation to cancel certain mining licences without compensation and such legislation had been enacted by the New South Wales parliament. Simultaneously with the Cunneen decision, the High Court unanimously rejected challenges to the validity of that legislation.  The Cunneen decision, while not affecting that legislation itself, raised questions about the validity of the investigations that led to those reports.

The ICAC disagreed with the High Court's interpretation of the act, as "contrary to the legislative intention" and to "the ordinary meaning of the words used in the section";  it urged the NSW government to legislate to broaden its powers retrospectively, so as to legalise its earlier actions as well as current investigations. However, the Inspector of the ICAC, former Supreme Court judge David Levine , criticised the ICAC's response as a "blustering" statement by  a "poor loser" and "an improper and dismissive attack on the judgment of the highest court in the land", and warned against "any knee-jerk legislative reaction that will serve to render the ICAC a second police force or crime commission". NSW premier Mike Baird stated that "NSW will continue to have a strong ICAC. And we will take every action necessary to ensure that's the case."  Former ICAC Commissioner David Ipp, although criticising the Cunneen investigation, strongly supported retrospective legislation to restore the ICAC's general powers.

On 6 May 2015, the NSW government rushed through the parliament, with all-party support, a bill to amend the Independent Commission Against Corruption Act;  the amendments were brought into effect immediately.  The Independent Commission Against Corruption Amendment (Validation) Act 2015 (NSW) does not simply reverse the Cunneen decision.  It amends the principal act so as to validate retrospectively the investigations that had led to the recent convictions, as well as the convictions themselves so far as affected by the Cunneen interpretation of the ICAC's powers. It also retrospectively validates other investigations by the ICAC up to that decision, and confirms that the ICAC is able to refer those investigations and any evidence gained by them to some other, unspecified person or body.  The future of the ICAC's powers will be considered by a review, which premier Baird had announced on 5 May, to be headed by former High Court chief justice Murray Gleeson and to report by 10 July.

Following the Cunneen decision, the ICAC confirmed that it would agree to court orders that would declare invalid its findings against mine owner Travers Duncan and other businessmen involved in a mining venture over the Obeid family's farm. The number of earlier investigations affected has been estimated at between eight and at least 50.

Duncan challenged the 2015 amendment act, claiming that it infringed the separation of powers established in the federal constitution, which as settled in Kable flows through to the NSW courts by cross-vesting.  On 9 September 2015, the High Court unanimously dismissed that appeal, awarding costs against Duncan.

Support and criticism
While the ICAC has received support from some sections of the media, it received substantial criticism in the wake of the Greiner and O'Farrell resignations. In 1994, former Premier Neville Wran suggested that the then Government should consider "[ridding] the ICAC legislation of its glaring abuses of civil rights". In the wake of the findings of corruption against Eddie Obeid and Ian Macdonald, Graham Richardson, a former Labor Senator, opined that the ICAC had caused "collateral damage" to innocent people, citing Eric Roozendaal as an example. After O'Farrell's resignation, Bruce Baird, a former State Deputy Liberal Leader who voted for the ICAC establishing legislation, was quoted on ABC TV describing the Commission as a "Star Chamber" that "trashes peoples' reputations". Professor Peter van Onselen also questioned the "Star Chamber" nature of the Commission and its history of "besmirching reputations". Former Victorian Premier Jeff Kennett suggested that the ICAC's actions with regard to O'Farrell had been "entrapment", while Chris Merritt of The Australian suggested that the investigation had been "ludicrous" and that it was Geoffrey Watson (counsel assisting the ICAC) who should have resigned instead. Nick Di Girolamo, a witness before the ICAC in proceedings that led to the resignation of O'Farrell, lodged a compliant in 2014 with the NSW Bar Association about Watson's behaviour during the hearings.  The Cunneen investigation was criticised, in the light of the eventual High Court decision, as having been heavy-handed from the start.

On the other hand, in an editorial in the wake of the O'Farrell resignation, the Sydney Morning Herald quoted new NSW Premier Mike Baird that "ICAC is doing exactly what it should do and it is something that I will sign up to 100 per cent"; the newspaper advocated creation of a federal equivalent. Likewise, Australian Greens Senator Lee Rhiannon renewed the Greens' long-standing call for a national equivalent to ICAC. Calls for changes to how the ICAC operates following O'Farrell's resignation were rejected by Professor Anne Twomey, an expert in public and constitutional law at the University of Sydney, because it was O'Farrell who misled the ICAC, breached the parliamentary code of conduct and failed to properly declare pecuniary interests. A more historical defence of the ICAC has been that it was set up by a Liberal government in an expectation, shared fearfully by the Labor opposition, that it would be in effect "a standing royal commission into Labor", and that Coalition members and supporters have been appalled that it has not turned out that way.

As of mid-December 2015, disputes continue.

The Australian Federal Integrity Commission, a proposed body "responsible for the implementation of a national pro-integrity framework, with an emphasis on prevention", has been described as a "federal ICAC".

Commissioners
Until 2017, the ICAC was led by a single commissioner, who served for a non-renewable term of five years. From 7 August 2017, this system was changed to a board comprising a Chief Commissioner and two part-time Commissioners appointed for a term of five years.

The following individuals have been appointed as commissioner since the commission's establishment:

Part-time Commissioners

High-profile cases
 Australian Museum theft of over 2,000 zoological specimens
 Gladys Berejiklian
 City of Botany Bay
 City of Canterbury
 City of Rockdale
Nick Greiner
 Nola Fraser
 Ian Macdonald
 Daryl Maguire
 Eddie Obeid
 Orange Grove affair
 Karyn Paluzzano 
 Eman Sharobeem
Rear Admiral Geoffrey Smith

See also

 Crime in Sydney
 Independent Commissioner Against Corruption (Northern Territory)
 Independent Commission Against Corruption (South Australia)
 Royal Commission into the New South Wales Police Service

References

External links
ICAC web site
ICAC Act second reading speech

Law enforcement in New South Wales
Government agencies of New South Wales
1989 establishments in Australia
New South Wales courts and tribunals
Government agencies established in 1988
Specialist law enforcement agencies of Australia
Anti-corruption agencies in Australia